Pecora alla cottora o callara is an ancient recipe typical of the Abruzzo tradition, widespread above all in the mountains, particularly in the Marsican area, in the L'Aquila basin and in the Monti della Laga area.

Being a poor and typical dish of the mountains and open places, during cooking various aromatic herbs and smells are added that the shepherds had at their disposal or thyme, laurel, rosemary, onion, garlic, carrot, celery, juniper, pepper and chili. In the version that involves the use of tomato sauce, it will have to be slightly diluted with water and will thicken around the meat and herbs during cooking. If it is not used instead, a sort of broth will be formed.

In both cases the preparation lasts from about four to six hours, since a long cooking allows to make sure that the sheep meat, which is quite hard, softens almost reaching " dissolve".

The recipe calls for the meat to be cut into stew, placed in the callara (or in a tall and capacious tinned pot) and immersed in cold water with the possible addition of white wine. During cooking it will be necessary to constantly eliminate the foam that will form as the sheep's fat will tend to melt and form lumps. The preparation will be brought to the boil and left to cook over medium and constant heat for about an hour, after which it will be drained and new water will be added, cooking again for a variable time (usually two or three hours) until the softness of the desired meat. Once this operation is completed, add the final cooking water together with the herbs (previously chopped and fried separately), any ripe chopped tomatoes (for the sauce) and salt, cooking over a low heat for about an hour and a half. The dish should be served hot.

See also 
 Arrosticini
 Italian cuisine
 List of Italian dishes
 List of lamb dishes
 Cuisine of Abruzzo

References 

Lamb dishes
Italian cuisine
Cuisine of Abruzzo